Under the Kilt is the third studio album by Swedish eurodance artist Jonny Jakobsen and his first album under the pseudonym Dr. Macdoo. It was released in 2001.

The album is best known for the title track "Under the Kilt", for which a music video was produced, and "Macahula Dance", for which a music video was released as bonus content on the original CD release. Both of these tracks were also released as singles. The title track is a parody of Scotland the Brave.

Upon its release, Under the Kilt was met with mixed reactions from the fans of Jakobsen's previous work as Dr. Bombay. The songs were widely considered by fans to be of lower quality than the songs on Rice & Curry.

Track listing
 Intro – 0:36
 Family Macdoo – 3:11
 Macahula Dance – 3:03
 Loch Ness – 3:12
 Under The Kilt – 3:13
 Hokey Pokey Man – 3:05
 Highland Reggae – 3:27
 Scottish Ghost (Extra Extra) – 3:02
 Mayday Mayday – 3:13
 Mad Piper – 3:18
 Bagpipesong – 2:57
 (Grandfather) Mac Macdoo – 3:07
 Outro – 1:36

References

2001 albums
Jonny Jakobsen albums
Warner Records albums